This is a list of British television related events from 1993.

Events

January
1 January 
Carlton Television takes over the weekday ITV franchise in London at midnight, replacing Thames after 24 years on the air. Meridian takes over the South of England franchise from TVS, Westcountry takes over the South West England franchise from TSW, Good Morning Television, GMTV takes over the national breakfast television franchise from TV-am at 6am and Teletext Ltd takes over the teletext franchise from ORACLE. The first edition of GMTV was presented by Eamonn Holmes and Anne Davies. 
The Independent Television Commission removes the limit on the value of prizes which can be given away on ITV game shows, set at £6,000 per episode since 1981, paving the way for the big money game shows of the late 1990s and 2000s.
Channel 4 becomes an independent statutory corporation. Under the terms of the Broadcasting Act 1990, the channel is now also allowed to sell its own airtime. Under the Act, ITV have agreed to fund Channel 4 if it falls below 14% of total TV advertising revenue. The channel also makes a payment of £38 million to ITV under terms of its funding formula.
The London News Network, a joint venture between London's two franchise holders, Carlton and LWT, begins providing a seven-day news service for ITV viewers in London.
Scottish Television launches new idents and presentation.
HTV launches a new logo and idents. 
2 January – Debut of the Saturday morning children's show Saturday Disney on ITV. 
3 January 
The Central produced children's series Tots TV makes its debut on ITV and starts airing in the US the following day. Its sponsor was Lego Duplo. 
The final edition of LWT News is broadcast and was presented by Anna Maria Ashe.
Debut of the Sunday morning current affairs series Breakfast with Frost on BBC1, presented by David Frost.
4 January 
John Birt succeeds Sir Michael Checkland as Director-General of the BBC. 
Scottish Television launches a 30-minute lunchtime edition of Scotland Today.
Launch of the ITV regional news programme London Tonight which airs seven days a week on both Carlton and LWT. 
Ulster's news service is renamed UTV Live. The programme broadcasts for 60 minutes, instead of 30.
The BBC launches Business Breakfast as a 60-minute stand-alone programme. It had previously been part of Breakfast News. Consequently, the BBC's weekday breakfast programmes start half an hour earlier, at 6am. Also on that day, BBC1 begins broadcasting on weekdays at 6am. A start-of-day Ceefax broadcast is retained although it now runs for 15 minutes rather than 30, beginning at 5:45am.
6 January 
The Times reports that IFE have revised and increased their offer to purchase former ITV franchise holder TVS.
The animated series The Animals of Farthing Wood which was based on the books by Colin Dann makes its debut on BBC1.
Debut of the acclaimed series Fame in the 20th Century, an eight-part BBC1 programme in which Clive James examines the nature of 20th century fame using archive footage and commentary. The series concludes on 24 February.
8 January 
ITV begins screening the latest series of Thomas the Tank Engine & Friends. However, the first few episodes are trimmed to fit the timeslot.
The children's comedy programme ZZZap! makes its debut on Children's ITV, starring the show you how its done gloves known as the Handymen, Richard Waites as the trouble-causing Cuthbert Lilly and the sneaky villain Tricky Dicky and Neil Buchanan as the smartest artist Smart Arty.
ITV introduces a third weekly episode of The Bill on Friday evenings. 
After a 14-year absence, the game show Celebrity Squares returns to ITV, with returning host Bob Monkhouse. 
11 January – Debut of The Good Sex Guide, a ground-breaking late night documentary series on ITV presented by Margi Clarke. Aired at 10.35pm, the programme attracts audience of 13 million, something that is unprecedented for a show aired in a late night timeslot. 
14 January – Eurosport and Screensport propose a merger to provide a single channel as both were operating at a loss, hoping that a merged channel would become financially profitable. 
16 January – ITV airs Alan Parker's occult detective film Angel Heart, starring Mickey Rourke and Robert DeNiro.
20 January – BBC2 airs live coverage of the inauguration of Bill Clinton as the 42nd President of the United States.
23 January – The Times reports that an offer by IFE to buy TVS for £56.5 million has been accepted.
24 January — The satellite channels Lifestyle and Lifestyle Satellite Jukebox close.

February
1 February 
IFE completes its deal to buy TVS.
BSkyB introduces a new system of film ratings often used for various times, replacing the British Board of Film Classification certificates.
6 February – The Casualty episode Family Matters which aired on that day sees an early appearance of the actress Kate Winslet.
7 February – Having completed its initial run of all 692 episodes of Prisoner: Cell Block H in December 1991, Central begins rerunning the series from the first episode. It is shown weekly, late on Sunday evenings until the end of 1994.
12–14 February – Channel 4 airs Love Weekend, a series of programmes with sexually explicit content coinciding with Valentine's Day weekend. It includes the network television premiere of Last Tango in Paris, starring Marlon Brando which is aired uncut on 14 February, Valentine's Day itself. The makers of Tango pay £20,000 for a 30-second advert for the soft drink in the film's first ad break.
14–16 February – Sky One debuts Diana: Her True Story, a dramatisation of Andrew Morton's biography of Diana, Princess of Wales. The film features Serena Scott Thomas as the Princess.
15 February 
 BBC2 airs Oprah Winfrey's interview with singer Michael Jackson.
CITV drops its in-vision continuity. 
16 February – The final episode of Count Duckula is broadcast on ITV. 
17 February – The original scheduled airdate for Mind the Baby, Mr. Bean, but it is postponed following the murder of Kirkby toddler James Bulger and is delayed for over a year until 25 April the following year. Instead, Mr. Bean in Room 426 is shown in its place. 
24 February 
John Nettles makes a cameo appearance as Jim Bergerac in an episode of the BBC1 comedy The Detectives set in Jersey.
The network television premiere of Rocky IV on ITV, starring Sylvester Stallone, Talia Shire, Carl Weathers, Burt Young, Dolph Lundgren and Brigitte Nielsen.
27 February – Boiling Point, an episode of the BBC medical drama Casualty is broadcast, but it is met with great controversy and outrage after it depicts rioting youths setting fire to a hospital's accident and emergency department. The BBC receives over 700 complaints about the violent nature of the episode, despite it airing after the 9pm watershed and warning viewers accordingly. However, the episode achieves viewing figures of 17.02 million, the highest for the show at the time.
28 February – BBC1 airs the first in a twelve-part adaptation of Peter Mayle's memoir A Year in Provence. The series, starring John Thaw and Lindsay Duncan concludes on 16 May. Unlike the book however, the miniseries is not well received by critics and in 2006, it is placed at number ten on a Radio Times list of the worst television programmes ever made. The writer John Naughton describes it as a "smugathon ... which achieved the near impossible – creating a John Thaw vehicle nobody liked".

March
1 March 
Screensport and Eurosport merge and Screensport closes. They merge to try to turn two loss making channels into a single profitable channel.
Games World makes its debut on Sky One.
5 March – ITV begins airing Doctor Finlay, a continuation series of the original Dr. Finlay's Casebook that aired during the 1960s.
6 March – An IRA bomb scare at BBC Television Centre means that the live Saturday night programme Noel's House Party cannot be broadcast. Instead, after a repeat of the previous year's Noel's Christmas Presents, host Noel Edmonds is forced to introduce a Tom and Jerry cartoon in its place, The Zoot Cat.
12 March – BBC1 airs Total Relief, the 1993 Comic Relief telethon.
23–24 March – Sky One airs Episodes 170 and 171 of the Australian soap E Street which features a hard-hitting storyline involving extreme character Sonny Bennett (Richard Huggett) who kills three characters in a car bomb explosion. Because the episodes aired in an early evening timeslot, they were preceded by a warning to viewers that they contain scenes that some may find upsetting. The 12:30pm repeat the following days, 24 and 25 March are dropped entirely and are replaced by episodes of The Simpsons.
26 March – ITV airs The Final Straw, an episode of The Bill in which Detective Constable Viv Martella, played by Nula Conwell is killed off when she is shot by a gunman after approaching his car.
27 March – The network television premiere of Eddie Murphy's gangster comedy Harlem Nights on BBC1, starring Eddie Murphy. 
28 March – The Bluebells 1984 single Young at Heart reaches number one in the UK Singles Chart following a rerelease after being featured in a Volkswagen Golf advert. It tops the charts for four weeks.
29 March – Central becomes the first ITV region to begin showing the New Zealand medical soap opera Shortland Street.

April
2 April – Debut of the comedy-drama The Riff Raff Element on BBC1. 
3 April – The 1993 Grand National, shown live on BBC1, is declared void after 30 of the 39 runners begin the race and carry on, despite there having been a false start.
4 April 
Children's BBC begin to repeat the school drama Grange Hill from its first series in 1978 on Sunday mornings on BBC2, as part of the show's 15th anniversary celebrations. These repeats end in 1999 with series 16. Prior to the repeats, the US animated series Rugrats also begins airing on that day.
The final episode of The Darling Buds of May is broadcast on ITV. 
5 April – The Children's Channel rebrands with a new series of idents depicting the live-action shots that shows the colours of blue, red and yellow and updates its new logo to be like the original one.
6 April – BBC1 airs This Is Michael Bolton, a recording of the singer in concert.
11 April – Sky One airs a special clip show episode of The Simpsons which features memorable moments from the first three seasons.
13 April – A new look is introduced across all the BBC's television news bulletins with a studio that is almost entirely computer-generated and features a glass model of the Corporation's coat of arms.
17 April 
After six years, six series and 179 editions, BBC1 broadcasts the final episode of its Saturday morning children's series Going Live!.
Arena presents a new four-part series, "Tales of Rock 'N' Roll" on BBC2 which looks at the story of four rock songs of how they came about and the history behind them and who and what they involved. Starting with Peggy Sue who was tracked down in Sacramento, California to be found running her own drain-clearing company Rapid Rooter and then to be taken back to Lubbock, Texas to recall how she knew Buddy Holly and how her marriage to drummer Jerry Allison turned out. Heartbreak Hotel where the song came to be written after the two songwriters discovered an article about a suicide in a hotel in Miami after reading about it in the Miami Herald. Walk on the Wild Side looks at all the characters that were involved in the song and how Lou Reed used to spend time at Andy Warhol's studio where they all did drugs (Holly Woodlawn and Joe Dallesandro were the only ones still around to tell the tale) and Highway 61 Revisited which looked at Bob Dylan's roots and everything that was connected with U.S. Route 61. The series ran for four consecutive weeks on Saturday nights on 17 April, 24 April, 1 May, and 8 May.
18 April – The network television premiere of Jonathan Lynn's 1990 madcap comedy film Nuns on the Run on Channel 4, starring Eric Idle and Robbie Coltrane.
23 April 
Pearson Television launches a friendly takeover bid for Thames Television, valuing the company at £99 million.
Episode 1681 of Neighbours which is the first episode that does not feature the 1980s-style titles and theme music is shown in the UK having previously made its debut in Australia on 18 May 1992.

May
2–3 May – Debut of the two-part adaptation of Jilly Cooper's 1985 novel Riders on ITV, starring Marcus Gilbert, Michael Praed, Arabella Tjye, Anthony Calf, Sienna Guillory, Annabel Giles, Gabrielle Beaumont and Stephanie Beacham. It was produced by Anglia after weeks of being trailed as "a sex sizzler".
10 May 
Debut of Peak Practice on ITV which originally starred Kevin Whately as Dr Jack Kerruish, Amanda Burton as Dr Beth Glover and Simon Shepherd as Dr Will Preston, though the roster of doctors would change many times over the course of the series.
Channel 4 airs Beyond Citizen Kane, a documentary film directed by Simon Hartog, produced by John Ellis and narrated by Chris Kelly. It details the dominant position of the Globo media group by founder Roberto Marinho and discusses the group's influence, power and political connections with the support of military dictatorship in Brazil.
13 May – Peter Dean makes his final appearance as EastEnders market trader Pete Beale. The character goes on the run with an old flame who he had reconnected with, only to discover she was married to a local gangster. Pete is killed off-screen on 16 December after the couple are killed in a car crash. 
15 May – Ireland's Niamh Kavanagh wins the 1993 Eurovision Song Contest with In Your Eyes, beating the United Kingdom's Sonia who sung Better the Devil You Know by 23 points.
16 May – Arnold Schwarzenegger, Bruce Willis and Sylvester Stallone appear as guests on the ITV chat show Aspel & Company. The edition is later censured by the Independent Television Commission because the actors were promoting their joint business venture Planet Hollywood.
19 May – After ten years and ten series in its original run, the final edition of Blockbusters is broadcast on ITV. But it continued for one more series on Sky One a year later and the five ITV regions showed this series until 1995. The game show would make sporadic returns on other channels, starting with a short-lived BBC version presented by Michael Aspel in 1997. 
22 May – Stars in Their Eyes returns on ITV with new presenter Matthew Kelly who takes over the role from Leslie Crowther who is still recovering from head injuries received in a car crash the previous year. Changes to the show include a live final where viewers phone in to decide the winner of the series. 
26 May – Noddy's Toyland Adventures makes its Australian debut on ABC.
27 May – The final episode of the five-part BBC Schools French language  adventure series La Marée et ses Secrets (The Tide and its Secrets) is broadcast, ending a run which began in 1984.
30 May – The network television premiere of Sam Raimi's 1990 fantasy horror film Darkman which was shown as part of the Moviedrome strand on BBC2, starring Liam Neeson, Frances McDormand and Larry Drake.

June
1 June – S4C introduces a new series of idents which depicted inanimate objects as having characteristics of dragons as a reference to the red dragon on the flag of Wales.
4 June 
When Roy Hattersley fails to appear on that day's edition of Have I Got News for You, the third time he has cancelled at the last minute, he is replaced with a tub of lard, credited as "The Rt. Hon. Tub of Lard MP", as it is "imbued with much the same qualities and liable to give a similar performance".
At 6pm, UTV unveils a new logo. A new jingle is also introduced with a distinct Celtic sound. On the same day, the extended studios at Havelock House are formally opened by presenter Gloria Hunniford.
6 June – The Animals of Farthing Wood makes its Irish debut in the on RTÉ. It still airs in this country to this day.
9 June – The network television premiere of Herbert Ross' 1989 comedy drama film Steel Magnolias on ITV, starring Sally Field, Dolly Parton, Shirley MacLaine, Daryl Hannah, Julia Roberts and Olympia Dukakis.
10 June – Les Dawson, the comedian and presenter who has presented the shows Jokers Wild, Blankety Blank and Fast Friends, dies suddenly from a heart attack during a medical checkup at a Greater Manchester hospital at the age of 62.
11 June – Channel 4 airs the final episodes of Cheers over three consecutive nights, finishing with the 80-minute finale on 13 June. However, due to the series popularity, repeats of the show begin the following weekend.
28 June – Channel 4 airs the last programmes produced for the ITV Schools strand. However, the channel continues to produce its own schools programming for several years afterwards.

July
1 July – Two production companies, Tiger Television and Aspect Film and Television, merge to form Tiger Aspect Productions.
4 July 
Derek Johns wins the 1993 series of MasterChef on BBC1. 
Debut of Stingray on Sky One, starring Nick Mancuso and it was created and produced by Stephen J. Cannell which is not to be confused with the earlier television series of the same name.
9 July 
BBC1 airs the final episode of Eldorado. The soap was axed due to poor ratings.
 ITV finishes repeating the latest series of Thomas the Tank Engine and Friends. The episode Thomas and Percy's Christmas Adventure has been excluded from this year's series of repeats.
22 July – Three former cable-only channels, Discovery, The Learning Channel and Bravo, begin broadcasting on the Astra satellite, ahead of the launch of the Sky Multichannels package on 1 September. 
22–23 July – The network television premiere of the US crime drama Stay the Night on BBC1, starring Barbara Hershey.
23 July – Prime Minister John Major gives an interview to ITN journalist Michael Brunson after his government wins a vote of confidence in the House of Commons earlier that day. During an unguarded moment following the interview and while still being recorded, Major refers to some of his cabinet colleagues as "Bastards". The incident which becomes known in the media as "Bastardgate", prompts the tabloid newspapers The Daily Mirror and The Sun to set up phone lines with recordings of the conversation that readers are invited to call. Both newspapers are warned to discontinue the lines by the regulatory body, the Independent Committee for the Supervision of Standards of Telephone Information Services because it feels that broadcasting the off-air conversation is a breach of privacy.
24 July – The fourth series of ITV's Stars in Their Eyes concludes with the show's first live Grand Final, allowing viewers to vote for their favourite act. The series is won by Jacquii Cann, performing as Alison Moyet.
July – The ITC publishes the findings of a technical review of the future viability of launching a fifth television channel. By October, more than 70 parties have responded to its publication, including some expressing interest in running Channel 5 should the licence be readvertised.

August
6 August – The network television premiere of Gore Vidal's Billy the Kid on BBC1, starring Val Kilmer.
 13–22 August – For the first time, British viewers are able to see full live coverage of the morning events of the World Athletics Championships. The full morning event coverage is broadcast on Eurosport, although the BBC does broadcast some live morning coverage.
18 August – ITV airs 15: The Life and Death of Philip Knight, Peter Kosminsky's drama-documentary film about a teenage man who took his own life in his cell at Swansea adult prison on 13 July 1990.
20 August – The network television premiere of the 1990 action comedy film Heart Condition on BBC1, starring Bob Hoskins and Denzel Washington.
26 August – June Brown makes her last appearance in EastEnders as Dot Cotton, although she would return in 1997. 
27 August – BBC1 airs a special live edition of Challenge Anneka in which Anneka Rice returns to some of the projects the show worked on to check on their progress.
29 August 
The network television premiere of Steven Spielberg's 1989 bittersweet romantic fantasy Always on BBC1, starring Richard Dreyfuss, Holly Hunter, John Goodman and Audrey Hepburn in her final on-screen appearance.
The final episode of The $64,000 Question is broadcast on ITV.
Larry Peerce's 1988 biographical television movie Elvis and Me airs on ITV, based on 1985 book of the same name starring Dale Midkiff as Elvis and Susan Walters as Priscilla Presley.
30 August – The network television premiere of the 1990 live-action adventure Teenage Mutant Ninja Turtles, a film based on the popular series known in the UK as Teenage Mutant Hero Turtles.

September
1 September 
Sky Multichannels launches. Consequently, many satellite channels, including Sky One and UK Gold, are now only viewable on satellite as part of a pay television package. At the same time, new idents launch on Sky's main channels. 
Three new channels launch on that day, The Family Channel, Nickelodeon UK and UK Living which are all part of the Sky Multichannels package.
IFE launches The Family Channel. It is based at The Maidstone Studios and some of its programming comes from the TVS archive with Flextech being a partner in the venture, taking a 39% stake in the business. It is an evening-only service and shares space with The Children's Channel which now ends its day two hours earlier at 5pm. It would relaunch as Challenge TV, a channel focusing on game shows on 3 February 1997. 
5 September 
Debut of Karen Arthur's 1992 biographical miniseries The Jacksons: An American Dream on ITV, focusing on the Jackson family and its popular Motown pop group. The second part airs on 8 September.
The network television premiere of Garry Marshall's 1990 romantic comedy film Pretty Woman airs on ITV, starring Richard Gere and Julia Roberts.
6 September 
UK Gold introduces a new ident with the form-up of the first logo against a silky blue background, replacing the original 'Goldie' idents.
Debut of the trolley-dash game show Supermarket Sweep on ITV, presented by Dale Winton.
Debut of the children's series Sooty & Co. on CITV, starring Matthew Corbett. 
Anne Robinson makes her debut as presenter of Watchdog on BBC1. 
11 September 
The network television premiere of Robert Zemeckis' 1989 time-travel sequel Back to the Future: Part II on BBC1, starring Michael J. Fox, Christopher Lloyd, Lea Thompson, Thomas F. Wilson and Elisabeth Shue.
Sky One moves E Street from its weekday early evening slot to a weekend daytime slot where it is shown in hour-long episodes on Saturdays from 6pm to 7pm and Sundays from 1pm to 2pm. The weekday 6:30pm slot is used to air episodes of Paradise Beach, but E Street is restored to the weekday slot in January 1994 after the move proves to be unpopular.
12 September 
The biographical drama miniseries Sinatra makes its debut on ITV which focuses on the life of the legendary singer and actor Frank Sinatra and stars Philip Casnoff, Olympia Dukakis, Joe Santos, Gina Gershon and Rod Steiger. The concluding part is aired on 13 September.
BBC1 airs A Foreign Field as part of the Screen One strand starring Alec Guinness, Lauren Bacall, Leo McKern and Jeanne Moreau. It was directed by Charles Sturridge and featured an ensemble cast of American, Australian, British and French stars and its title evokes Rupert Brooke's 1915 poem The Soldier.
16 September – The network television premiere of Die Hard 2: Die Harder on ITV, starring Bruce Willis, Bonnie Bedelia, Dennis Franz and Reginald VelJohnson.
17 September – Cartoon Network and classic movie channel TNT launch in the UK. They share the same transponder with Cartoon Network broadcasting during the day and TNT broadcasting during the evening and overnight. The channels are free-to-air on satellite and are not part of the Sky Multichannels package.
19 September 
The network television premiere of Peter Weir's 1989 teen drama film Dead Poets Society on ITV, starring Robin Williams.
Channel 4 airs Blue, a drama film directed by Derek Jarman who is partially blind and only able to see in shades of blue. BBC Radio 3 also broadcasts the film simultaneously so that viewers could hear the soundtrack in stereo.
20 September 
 The educational numeracy series Numbertime makes its debut on BBC2. 
Schools programmes continue to be shown on Channel 4, now under the branding of Channel 4 Schools with new idents to accompany the change. 
21 September – BBC1 airs A Murderer's Game, an edition of the Crimewatch File series looking at the 1992 hunt for the kidnapper of the Birmingham estate agent Stephanie Slater.
22 September 
The game show Lose A Million makes its debut on ITV, presented by Chris Tarrant with a voiceover by Honor Blackman in which contestants win a total of £1 million and attempt to lose as many of them as possible by answering questions incorrectly. It was later axed on 1 December and the show lasted only a single series.
Children's ITV debuts Old Bear Stories and Avenger Penguins, the former would go on to win a BAFTA award for Best Children's Programme.
BBC1 airs Hostage, an edition of the Inside Story strand in which Terry Waite speaks about his years of captivity in Beirut.
23 September – Debut of the popular children's educational series Come Outside on BBC2, starring Lynda Baron as Auntie Mabel alongside her dog Pippin. 
24 September
The animated series Philbert Frog makes its debut on BBC1.
Channel 4 debuts the late-night magazine topical programme Eurotrash, presented by Antoine de Caunes and Jean-Paul Gaultier, with narrative voiceovers by British comic actress Maria McErlane. The show features a comical review of unusual topics mainly from Western and Central Europe, with all intellectual property rights to the series are now controlled by the production company Rapido TV.
September – Scottish Television reschedules Emmerdale from 7pm to 5.10pm and uses the slot to broadcast daily regional programmes, including Take the High Road. This arrangement continues until early 1998 when Emmerdale is moved back to its original slot.
September–October – Channel 4 broadcasts live coverage of the Professional Chess Association version of the World Chess Championship 1993. Two hours of coverage are broadcast for each match. This is the first time that live chess has been broadcast in the UK.

October
1 October – QVC launches, becoming the first shopping channel in the UK. The channel had originally launched in the US in 1986.
2 October 
The Saturday morning children's series Live & Kicking makes its debut on BBC1, presented by Andi Peters, Emma Forbes, and John Barrowman.
Super Channel is renamed as the NBC Super Channel following it being taken over by the US company General Electric, then-parent of the NBC network.
The US superhero series Mighty Morphin Power Rangers makes its UK debut on Sky One.
3 October – Leslie Crowther suffers a serious car crash on the M5 motorway which effectively ends his television career.
19 October – The last on-screen appearance of Roly, the EastEnders dog and Queen Vic resident who has been part of the soap since the first episode. The episode featuring his demise attracted an audience of 14.8 million viewers. The dog who played Roly died during a heatwave on 2 August 1995.
20 October 
Debut of Thatcher: The Downing Street Years, a four-part BBC1 series looking at the premiership of Margaret Thatcher.
Kirsty Wark makes her debut as anchor on BBC2's Newsnight.
The Independent Television Commission issues Channel 4 with a formal warning for an episode of the soap Brookside which aired on 7 and 8 May that depicted a wife stabbing her abusive husband to death.
21 October – Channel 4 is granted permission by the High Court to show excerpts from Stanley Kubrick's controversial 1971 film A Clockwork Orange as part of its Without Walls series. The film Forbidden Fruit, is shown on 26 October. Time Warner had sought to prevent Channel 4 from showing scenes from the film which has been banned in the UK since 1973 after Kubrick withdrew it amid concerns it was encouraging violence; the ban is lifted in 2000, a year after Kubrick's death.
29 October – The final episode of the game show Every Second Counts is broadcast on BBC1.

November
2 November – Prime Minister John Major announces a review of the 1988 broadcasting ban, telling the House of Commons that broadcasters are stretching it "to the limit and perhaps beyond".
7 November – The US animated series based on the popular Sega video game Adventures of Sonic the Hedgehog makes its debut on Channel 4, two months after its US debut.
8 November – The first advert for an undertaker's is broadcast during an early evening episode of the Scottish soap opera Take the High Road on ITV.
9 November 
It'll Never Work?, a children's series showcasing new inventions and developments in scientific technology, makes its debut on BBC1.
The network television premiere of Paul Verhoeven's 1990 science-fiction action thriller Total Recall on ITV, starring Arnold Schwarzenegger, Sharon Stone, Rachel Ticotin, Michael Ironside and Ronny Cox.
16 November – Patsy Palmer makes her EastEnders debut as the long-running character Bianca Jackson.
18 November 
Several schoolchildren are killed in a minibus crash on the M40. The incident is carried as the lead story on ITV's Early Evening News and News at Ten, while the BBC's Nine O'Clock News carries it as the third item, behind the State Opening of Parliament and a piece about the Troubles. The BBC's decision to put the item third attracts strong criticism from other journalists who question the reasoning behind it and accuse the BBC for being out of touch.
The time-travelling sitcom Goodnight Sweetheart makes its debut on BBC1, starring Nicholas Lyndhurst, Michelle Holmes, Dervla Kirwan and Victor McGuire.
19 November – Channel 4 airs the first "Late Licence" which is shown on Friday and Saturday nights until around 5am. The first "Late Licence" is presented by Smashie and Nicey with the strand showing repeats of the channel's programmes such as editions of The Word.
20 November – Leslie Crowther makes his first appearance since his accident on The Royal Variety Performance, appearing alongside Cilla Black.
22 November – On the 30th anniversary of the assassination of John F. Kennedy, Channel 4 airs the documentary As It Happened: The Killing of Kennedy which gives a minute-by-minute account of the events of 22 November 1963 with contributions from scores of eyewitnesses.
23 November – 30th anniversary of the first broadcast of Doctor Who. 
26–27 November – BBC1 airs the two-part Doctor Who special Dimensions in Time, a crossover with EastEnders. The episode is part of the 1993 Children in Need appeal and is the first new Doctor Who episode since the series ended in December 1989.
29 November 
The final episode of The Krypton Factor is broadcast on ITV after 16 years. It returned in 1995 with co-host Penny Smith and was briefly revived in 2009 and 2010 which was presented by Ben Shephard. 
The three-part dramatisation of Carol Clewlow's 1989 erotic novel A Woman's Guide to Adultery makes its debut on ITV, starring Amanda Donohoe, Theresa Russell, Adrian Dunbar and Sean Bean. The serial concludes on 13 December.

December
5 December 
Mr Blobby, a novelty song inspired by the Noel's House Party character of the same name, tops the UK Singles Chart. After being replaced a week later by Take That's Babe, the song returns to the top to become the 1993 Christmas number one.
The pilot episode for the comedy talk show Mrs Merton is shown by Granada Television with the titular character played by Caroline Aherne. It would be picked up for a full series on BBC2 in 1995. 
6 December – ITV's North West England franchise holder Granada launches a hostile takeover for London Weekend Television, worth £600million. The takeover bid comes about because of the relaxation of the rules governing the network. LWT tries to outstep the takeover bid by initiating talks with Yorkshire Television and Scottish Television.
9 December – Peter Sissons hosts his last edition of Question Time, having chaired the show since 1989.
13 December – The Times reports that a conflict of words has broken out between London Weekend Television and Granada over LWT's talks with Yorkshire Television. Granada claims the YTV-LWT deal is "something cobbled together by desperate men". Gerry Robinson, the Chairman of Granada plc is dismissive of the deal, especially since Yorkshire has made a £10million loss and is already paying much of its revenue to the government. Reports also suggest if LWT bid for Yorkshire Television it would also form an alliance with Anglia who would takeover Tyne Tees Television. 
18 December – BBC2 broadcasts the Arena special "Radio Night", an ambitious simulcast with BBC Radio 4.
21 December – The Marcopolo 1 satellite is sold to Sweden's Nordic Satellite AB and is renamed Sirius 1.
22 December – Plato's Stepchildren, an episode of the US science-fiction series Star Trek, is shown on BBC2 for the first time, having not been seen on British television since its original run on BBC1.
24 December 
Christmas Eve highlights on BBC1 include the network television premiere of the 1990 espionage thriller The Hunt for Red October, starring Sean Connery and Alec Baldwin.
Ed Tudor Pole succeeds Richard O'Brien as presenter on The Crystal Maze on Channel 4. 
25 December 
Christmas Day highlights on BBC1 include the network television premieres of the time-travel sequel Back to the Future: Part III with Michael J Fox and Christopher Lloyd and the smash hit romantic fantasy Ghost starring Patrick Swayze and Demi Moore.
Channel 4 airs its first Alternative Christmas message. The broadcast features a contemporary, often controversial celebrity, delivering a message in the manner of The Queen. The first alternative message is delivered by Quentin Crisp.
26 December 
Boxing Day highlights on BBC1 include the films Superman III and The Outlaw Josey Wales.
The Wrong Trousers, the second short film starring Wallace and Gromit, makes its debut on BBC2, featuring the voice of Peter Sallis as Wallace.
27 December 
Channel 4 airs Prince Cinders, a short animated film based on a book by children's author and illustrator Babette Cole. The film features the voices of well known stars such as Dexter Fletcher, Jonathan Ross, Jim Broadbent, Jennifer Saunders and Craig Charles, as well as two original songs performed by singer Miriam Stockley and comedian Lenny Henry.
The pilot episode for the comedy panel game show Shooting Stars is broadcast on BBC2, presented by Vic Reeves and Bob Mortimer. It would return for a full series in 1995. 
30 December 
The Times reports that Granada has increased its takeover bid for LWT to £658million.
Episodes of Emmerdale featuring the controversial plane crash storyline begin airing on ITV. The storyline was developed to win higher ratings for the series which was threatened with cancellation due to low viewing figures. However, although it succeeded in turning around the fortunes of the series, ITV received many complaints about the timing of the story which came shortly after the fifth anniversary of the Lockerbie Disaster.
31 December 
The first edition of the annual Scottish football-themed comedy sketch show Only an Excuse? is broadcast on BBC1 Scotland which was aired each Hogmanay.
BBC2 airs the first Hootenanny, an annual New Year's Eve music show hosted by Jools Holland. The first edition includes performances from Sting, the Gipsy Kings and Sly and Robbie.

Debuts

BBC1
 3 January – Breakfast with Frost (1993–2005)
 5 January – First Letter First (1993)
 6 January 
The Animals of Farthing Wood (1993–1995)
Fame in the 20th Century (1993)
The Adventures of Buzzy Bee and Friends (1993)
The Return of the Psammead (1993)
 7 January – Joking Apart (1993–1995)
 10 January – Gallowglass (1993)
 27 January – The Detectives (1993–1997)
 15 February – Bonjour la Classe (1993)
 17 February – Century Falls (1993)
 28 February – A Year in Provence (1993)
 9 March – Luv (1993–1994)
 11 March – Chef! (1993–1996)
 28 March – You, Me and It (1993)
 2 April – The Riff Raff Element (1993–1994)
 10 April – Westbeach (1993)
 27 May – Every Silver Lining (1993)
 6 June – Lady Chatterley (1993)
 15 July – The Leaving of Liverpool (1993)
 17 July – McGee and Me! (1989–1995)
 7 September – Tales of the Tooth Fairies (1992)
 13 September – Albert the 5th Musketeer (1993)
 18 September 
Happy Families (1993)
Harry (1993–1995)
 21 September – The Smell of Reeves and Mortimer (1993–1995)
 24 September – Philbert Frog (1993)
 25 September – Marlene Marlowe Investigates (1993–1994)
 27 September – The Greedysaurus Gang (1993)
 30 September – The Adventures of Blinky Bill (1994)
 2 October – Live & Kicking (1993–2001)
 19 October – Children's Hospital (1993–2003)
 31 October – Scarlet and Black (1993)
 9 November – It'll Never Work? (1993–1999)
 11 November 
If You See God, Tell Him (1993)
The Boot Street Band (1993)
 15 November 
Mortimer and Arabel (1993–1994)
Goodnight Sweetheart (1993–1999)
 18 November – Life in the Freezer (1993)
 21 November – To Play the King (1993)
 29 November – Doctor Who: Thirty Years in the TARDIS (1993)
 8 December – Stark (1993)
 30 December – Health and Efficiency (1993–1995)
 31 December – Only an Excuse? (1993–2020)

BBC2
 7 January – Joking Apart (1993–1995)
 12 January – Magic Grandad (1993–2009)
 19 January – The Ark (1993) (documentary series)
 3 February – The Mushroom Picker (1993)
 24 February – Mr Wroe's Virgins (1993)
 7 March – The Living Soap (1993)
 24 March 
Goggle-Eyes (1993)
I, Lovett (1993)
 31 March – Burke's Backyard (1987–2004)
 4 April – Rugrats (1991–1995, 1996–2004)
 1 May – Olly's Prison (1993) 
 4 June – One Foot in the Past (1993–2000)
 13 July – Far Flung Floyd (1993)
 22 July – No Stilettos (1993)
 1 September – Love and Reason (1993)
 20 September 
Newman and Baddiel in Pieces (1993)
Numbertime (1993–2001)
 23 September – Come Outside (1993–1997)
 6 October – Seinfeld (1989–1998)
 22 October – The Larry Sanders Show (1992–1998)
 3 November – The Buddha of Suburbia (1993)
 14 November – The Return of the Borrowers  (1993)
 15 November – Consuming Passions (1992–2001)
 5 December – The Mrs Merton Show (1993–1998)
 8 December – Stark (1993)
 26 December – The Wrong Trousers (1993)
 27 December – Shooting Stars (1993–1997, 2002, 2008–2011)
 31 December – Jools Annual Hootenanny (1993–present)

ITV
 1 January – GMTV (1993–2010)
 2 January 
Unnatural Causes (1993)
Saturday Disney (1993–1996) 
 3 January 
The Man Who Cried (1993)
Tots TV (1993–1998)
 4 January 
ITV News Meridian (1993–present)
Harry's Mad (1993–1996)
Westcountry Live (1993–2009)
 5 January 
Full Stretch (1993)
Oasis (1993)
Wizadora (1993–1998)
 8 January 
ZZZap! (1993–2001)
Eye of the Storm (1993)
 9 January 
Speaking our Language (1993–1996)
Tracey Ullman: A Class Act (1993)
 10 January — Anna Lee (1993–1994)
 11 January – 
Head over Heels (1993)
The Good Sex Guide (1993–1996) 
 17 February – Three Seven Eleven (1993–1994)
 23 February – The 10 Percenters (1993–1996)
 1 March – September Song (1993–1995)
 5 March – Doctor Finlay (1993–1996)
 8 March – A Statement of Affairs (1993)
 9 March – The Brighton Belles (1993–1994)
 29 March – Shortland Street (1992–present)
 6 April – The Sherman Plays (1993–1997)
 7 April – The Lodge (1993)
 8 April 
 Body & Soul (1993)
 Just a Gigolo (1993)
 9 April – The Gingerbread Girl (1993)
 16 April – Conjugal Rites (1993–1994)
 25 April – Seekers (1993)
 2 May – Riders (1993)
 5 May – Sharpe (1993–1997, 2006–2008)
 9 May – Harnessing Peacocks (1993)
 10 May – Peak Practice (1993–2002)
 20 May – Rik Mayall Presents (Anthology – 6 episodes: Micky Love, Briefest Encounter, Dancing Queen, The Big One, Dirty Old Town and Clair de Lune) (1993)
 21 May – Strange but True? (1993–1997)
 10 June – Telltale (1993)
 29 June – Rubbish, King of the Jumble (1993–1994)
 3 July – Time After Time (1993–1995)
 7 July – What You Lookin' At? (1993)
 8 July – Michael Ball (1993–1995)
 11 July – Over the Rainbow (1993)
 12 July – Frank Stubbs Promotes (1993–1994)
 27 July – Kyle Again (1993–1994)
 18 August – 15: The Life and Death of Philip Knight (1993)
 6 September 
Dale's Supermarket Sweep (1993–2001, 2007)
Sooty & Co. (1993–1998)
 10 September 
The Legends of Treasure Island (1993–1995)
Alphabet Castle (1993–1995)
 22 September 
Avenger Penguins (1993–1994)
Lose A Million (1993)
 24 September – Old Bear Stories (1993–1997)
 27 September – Cracker (1993–1996, 2006)
 15 October – Demob (1993)
 16 October – Circles of Deceit (1993; 1995–1996)
 21 October – All in the Game (1993)
 2 November – Hurricanes (1993–1997)
 4 November – Wolf It (1993–1996)
 14 November – SeaQuest DSV (1993–1996)
 29 November – A Woman's Guide to Adultery (1993)
 3 December – All or Nothing at All (1993)
Unknown 
Dr. Quinn, Medicine Woman (1993–1998)
Goof Troop (1992–1993)
Darkwing Duck (1991–1992)

Channel 4
 2 January – Spiff and Hercules (1989)
 3 January – Hammerman (1992)
 4 January – Lift Off (1992–1995)
 21 February – Lipstick on Your Collar (1993)
 27 February – Fourways Farm (1993–1996)
 6 June – Comics (1993)
 12 June – The Legend of White Fang (1992–1994)
 6 July – An Exchange of Fire (1993)
 10 July – California Dreams (1993–1996)
 13 July – The Adventures of T-Rex (1992–1993)
 25 August – Mr Don & Mr George (1993)
 24 September – Eurotrash (1993–2004)
 28 September – Tales of the City (1993; 1998)
 17 October – Wild West C.O.W.-Boys of Moo Mesa (1992–1997)
 31 October 
King Arthur and the Knights of Justice (1993)
Popeye and Son (1993–2003)
 2 November – Closing Numbers (1993)
 7 November – Adventures of Sonic the Hedgehog (1993)
 27 December – Prince Cinders (1993)
 29 December – Who Dealt? (1993)
 30 December – Jo Brand Through the Cakehole (1993–1996)

Sky One
20 January – The Round Table (1992)
14 February – Diana: Her True Story (1993)
1 March – Games World (1993–1998)
2 May – The Young Indiana Jones Chronicles (1992–1993)
10 June – Eddie Dodd (1991)
4 July – Stingray (1985–1987)
20 July – Civil Wars (1991–1993)
4 August – Picket Fences (1992–1996)
15 August – Star Trek: Deep Space Nine (1993–1999)
6 September – Paradise Beach (1993)
7 September – Moomin (1990)
2 October 
X-Men (1992–1997)
Mighty Morphin Power Rangers (1993–1995)
31 October – Bloodlines: Murder in the Family (1993)
14 November – The Sands of Time (1992)
21 November – JFK: Reckless Youth (1993)

Channels

New channels

Defunct channels

Rebranded channels

Television shows

Returning this year after a break of one year or longer
 Celebrity Squares (1975–1979, 1993–1997, 2014–2015)
 The Inspector Alleyn Mysteries (1990, 1993–1994)

Ending this year
 Blockbusters (1983–1993, 1994–1995, 1997, 2000–2001, 2012, 2019)
 First Tuesday (1983–1993)
 Highway (1983–1993)
 Henry's Cat (1983–1993)
 Busman's Holiday (1985–1993)
 ScreenPlay (1986–1993)
 Every Second Counts (1986–1993)
 Going Live! (1987–1993)
 Runway (1987–1993)
 Watching (1987–1993)
 Count Duckula (1988–1993)
 You Rang, M'Lord? (1988–1993)
 I, Lovett (1989–1993)
 Absolutely (1989–1993)
 KYTV (1989–1993)
 Press Gang (1989–1993)
 Rolf's Cartoon Club (1989–1993)
 The $64,000 Question (1990–1993)
 Jeeves and Wooster (1990–1993)
 Uncle Jack (1990–1993)
 Families (1990–1993)
 The Darling Buds of May (1991–1993)
 The Full Wax (1991–1993) 
 Radio Roo (1991–1993) 
 Spider (1991–1993)
 Spender (1991–1993)
 Eldorado (1992–1993)
 Funnybones (1992–1993)
 Grace & Favour (1992–1993)
 The Good Guys (1992–1993)

Births
 10 January – Jacob Scipio, actor
 22 January – Tommy Knight, actor
 27 January – Freddy Carter, actor
 8 March – Stephanie Davis, actress
 11 March – Jodie Comer, actress
 25 June – Barney Clark, actor
 23 November – Isabel Hodgins, actress

Deaths

See also
 1993 in British music
 1993 in British radio
 1993 in the United Kingdom
 List of British films of 1993

References